WCMV may refer to:

 WCMV (TV), a television station (channel 34, virtual 27) licensed to serve Cadillac, Michigan, United States
 WCMV-FM, a radio station (94.3 FM) licensed to serve Leland, Michigan